Enrique Ojeda(born 1928) was a professor at Boston College for 30 years, is the author of several books about Latin American literature, and has been called "the world's leading authority" on Ecuadoran poet Jorge Carrera Andrade. Ojeda has also written extensively on Ecuadoran novelist Jorge Icaza.

Ojeda grew up in Quito, Ecuador, where his father had a dental practice. He attended prep school at Quito's Colegio Loyola, a Jesuit institution, then earned a BA and an MA at the Pontifical Catholic University of Ecuador. Moving to the U.S., Ojeda earned an MA in French Literature at the University of Cincinnati in 1959. In 1966, Ojeda earned a Ph.D. in Romance Languages and Literatures from Harvard University.

Books
 Cuatro obras de Jorge Icaza, Quito, Casa de la  Cultura Ecuatoriana, 1960.
 Jorge Carrera Andrade. Introducción al estudio de su vida y de su obra, cover, Madrid-New York,  Torres Library of Literary Studies, 1972
 La ciudad sobre la colina, cover, Quito, Banco Central del Ecuador, 1990
 Ensayos sobre Jorge Icaza, cover, Quito, Casa de la Cultura Ecuatoriana, 1991
 En pos del minero de la noche, cover, Quito, Paradiso Editores, 2010

Ojeda edited, and wrote introductions for, the following books by Jorge Carrera Andrade:
 Poesía última, New  York, Las Americas Publishing Company, 1968
 Reflexiones sobre la poesía hispanoamericana, Quito, Casa de la Cultura Ecuatoriana, 1987
 El volcán y el colibri. Autobiografía, Quito, Corporación Editora Nacional, 1989
 Relatos de un gozoso tragaleguas, Quito, Banco Central del Ecuador, 1994
 Poesías desconocidas de Jorge Carrera Andrade, cover, Quito, Paradiso Editores, 2002
 Microgramas, Quito, Orogenia, 2007

Ojeda wrote a chapter called "Jorge Carrera Andrade" for Latin American Writers, Supplement I, New York, Charles Scribner's Sons, 2002

Ojeda wrote many journal articles, including, "Littérature de l' Équateur", "Les années Fastes: de 1920 a 1960", Nuit Blanche, Québec, Février 2004

Personal
Ojeda lives with his wife, Jo Ellen Haynes Ojeda, in Barrington, Rhode Island and Ponte Vedra Beach, Florida.

photo of Enrique Ojeda

References

External links
 The Official Website of Jorge Carrera Andrade 
 Letter from Jorge Icaza to Enrique Ojeda

1928 births
Living people
Boston College faculty
Pontifical Catholic University of Ecuador alumni
University of Cincinnati alumni
Harvard University alumni
Ecuadorian emigrants to the United States
20th-century American writers
21st-century American writers
20th-century American male writers